Wing Commander  Duncan Joseph George Stubbs (born 1961) was the RAF Music Services' Principal Director of Music.

Stubbs joined the Royal Air force in 1983, initially as a member of the service's Central Band. He was granted a commission as a flying officer in March 1990.

References

External links
Royal Air Force - Principal Director of Music, RAF Music Services
University of York - Wg Cdr Duncan Stubbs

1961 births
Royal Air Force officers
Living people
Royal Air Force musicians